Paul Philip Overgaard (February 15, 1930 – February 4, 2022) was an American politician in the state of Minnesota who was a member of the Minnesota Senate and the Minnesota House of Representatives. A member of the Republican Party of Minnesota, he represented District 9 (present-day district 27) in the Senate and 9A (present-day 27A) in the House, which includes portions of Freeborn and Waseca counties in southeastern Minnesota.

Education, military, and career
Born in Albert Lea, Minnesota, Overgaard graduated from Albert Lea High School. He served in the military from 1948 to 1953 and fought in the Korean War. Overgaard spent the morning of his 21st birthday on February 15, 1951, in a firefight where he parachuted twice, led a company of soldiers in battle after his commander and fellow platoon leaders fell, and sustained a gunshot wound in his thigh forceful enough to send shrapnel into his ankle and heel. He helped win the battle that erupted at 3 a.m. on his birthday in part by calling off friendly fire that would have produced a tragic result had it continued unchecked. Overgaard was awarded a Silver Star, a Purple Heart, and an article and photo in the Minneapolis Star on June 11, 1951, announcing his return to Albert Lea, then stateside service in Ft. Bragg, North Carolina. After his return from Korea, he was a grain farmer and worked for Mutual Funds Securities as an investment adviser and as vice president of Imperial Financial Services, Inc. Overgaard died on February 4, 2022, at the age of 91.

Minnesota House of Representatives

Elections
Overgaard was first elected in 1962. He was reelected in 1964 and 1966. He decided not to seek reelection in 1968.

Committee assignments
For the 65th legislative session, Overgaard was a part of:
Civil Administration Committee
Employees Compensation Committee
Highways Committee
Recreation and Water Resources Committee
Taxes Committee
University and College Committee

For the 64th legislative session, Overgaard was a part of:
Employees Compensation Committee
General Legislation and Veterans Affairs Committee
Highways Committee
Municipal Affairs Committee 
Taxes Committee

For the 63rd legislative session, Overgaard was a part of:
Cooperatives and Marketing Committee
Employees Compensation Committee
Industrial and Employee Relations Committee
Metropolitan and Urban Affairs Committee
Municipal Affairs Committee
Recreation and Water Resources Committee

Tenure
Overgaard represented District 31A in the Minnesota House of Representatives from January 8, 1963 to January 6, 1969 (63rd, 64th, and 65th legislative sessions).

Minnesota Senate

Elections
Overgaard was first elected to the Minnesota Senate in 1970. He lost reelection in 1972.

Committee assignments
For the 67th legislative session, Overgaard was a part of:
Civil Administration Committee
Commerce and Insurance Committee
Education Committee
Labor Relations Committee
Local Government Committee
Regulated Industries Committee

Tenure
Overgaard was sworn in on January 5, 1971, serving in the 67th Minnesota legislature.

Personal life
Overgaard was married to his wife, Janet. They had five daughters and lived in Albert Lea, Minnesota.

References

External links

|-

1930 births
2022 deaths
Republican Party Minnesota state senators
Republican Party members of the Minnesota House of Representatives
American Lutherans
People from Albert Lea, Minnesota
Military personnel from Minnesota
Businesspeople from Minnesota
Farmers from Minnesota